Balephi is a rural municipality located in Sindhupalchok District of Bagmati Province of Nepal. It is bordered by Barabishe Municipality, Sunkoshi Rural Municipality, Tripura Sundari Rural Municipality, Jugal Rural Municipality, and SangachokGadhi Municipality.

References

External links
 Official website

Populated places in Sindhupalchowk District
Rural municipalities in Sindhupalchowk District
Rural municipalities of Nepal established in 2017